Scrobipalpa distincta is a moth in the family Gelechiidae. It was described by Oleksiy V. Bidzilya and Hou-Hun Li in 2010. It is found in China in Gansu, Ningxia and Henan.

Etymology
The species name refers to the distinctive genitalia and external characters of the new species and is derived from Latin distinctus (meaning separate, different).

References

Scrobipalpa
Moths described in 2010